The Janusz Kusociński Memorial (Polish: Memoriał Janusza Kusocińskiego) is an annual track and field meeting at different venues in Poland, in recent times at the Silesian Stadium in Chorzów, Poland.

The meeting was first held in 1954 in memory of the Polish runner Janusz Kusociński, the 1932 Olympic champion over 10,000 metres, who was killed on 21 June 1940 during the German AB-Aktion Operation. The event was located at the 10th-Anniversary Stadium in Warsaw for much of its early history. Later on, the meet venue changed to a rotational basis and the memorial was held in cities such as Lublin, Bydgoszcz, Poznań, Szczecin and most recently Chorzów. In 2022 the meeting was part of the 2022 World Athletics Continental Tour on gold level.

From its inception to the present day, the Janusz Kusociński Memorial has attracted world record holders and Olympic medallists. Initially attracting top Eastern European athletes (including Soviet Olympic champion Vladimir Kuts at the first competition), Frenchman Michel Jazy, American Bill Nieder, and China's Ni Zhiqin were among the participants in its first decade. The 1970s saw runners Ron Clarke and Filbert Bayi compete, while the 1980s featured performers including Wolfgang Schmidt and Sergey Bubka. Among the world record breakers to appear at the memorial in the 1990s were Svetlana Masterkova, Wilson Kipketer and Jan Železný. Numerous Olympic, World and European Championship level athletes continue to take part on an annual basis.

Each edition features a long-distance memorial race. This event has been dominated by East African athletes in the last decade. In addition to the memorial race, the meeting typically has high calibre performances in the throwing events.

The meeting, which holds European Athletics Outdoor Meetings status, is among the foremost Polish track and field competitions, alongside the annual Pedro's Cup events.

Meet records

Men

Women

References

External links

Official website
Meet Records 31 December 2017 updated

European Athletic Association meetings
Recurring sporting events established in 1954
Athletics competitions in Poland
Summer events in Poland